Tony Madlock (born February 17, 1970) is an American basketball coach who is the current head coach of the Alabama State Hornets men's basketball team.

Playing career
A Memphis native who starred at Melrose High School, Madlock played collegiately for Memphis under Larry Finch from 1988 to 1992, and was part of the Tigers' 1992 Elite Eight squad during his senior year. He still ranks as the all-time leader in games played with 128.

Coaching career
Madlock began his coaching career at his high school alma mater for three seasons, helping guide Melrose to a state tournament runner-up finish in 1997. He'd get his first college coaching position at Arkansas State, working under Dickey Nutt. There he was part of the Red Wolves' 1999 NCAA tournament squad. In 2006, Madlock would join Tony Barbee's staff at UTEP, helping the Miners to a Conference USA regular season title and NCAA Tournament appearance in 2010. He'd follow Barbee to Auburn the following season, and in 2014, Madlock would join Andy Kennedy's staff at Ole Miss. On February 18, 2018, Kennedy announced his resignation from the head coaching position, and Madlock was named interim head coach for the remainder of the season. Madlock would compile a 1–4 record.

After the 2018 season, Madlock would return to Memphis, reuniting with college teammate Penny Hardaway as an assistant coach for the Tigers. On March 25, 2021, Madlock was named the head coach at South Carolina State, replacing Murray Garvin. After one season at South Carolina State where he guided the team to a 15–16 overall record, Madlock was named the head coach at Alabama State, replacing Mo Williams who departed for the Jackson State head coaching position.

Head coaching record

References

1970 births
Living people
American men's basketball coaches
American men's basketball players
Arkansas State Red Wolves men's basketball coaches
Auburn Tigers men's basketball coaches
Basketball coaches from Tennessee
Basketball players from Tennessee
Memphis Tigers men's basketball coaches
Memphis Tigers men's basketball players
Ole Miss Rebels men's basketball coaches
South Carolina State Bulldogs basketball coaches
Alabama State Hornets basketball coaches
UTEP Miners men's basketball coaches